The Caura, is a tributary of the Orinoco River, located in Bolívar State in Venezuela. Its flow is the second after the Caroni River among the affluents of the Orinoco River, with almost .
The river is inhabited by both the Ye'kuana and Sanema indigenous groups.

Basin
The river drains the Guayanan Highlands moist forests ecoregion.
Its major tributary is the Erebato. The Caura is navigable up to Pará Falls (Salto Pará), an impressive waterfall formed by two branches of the river with an island in the middle 
Both branches have some rapids and join in one of the most remarkable waterfalls in the Orinoco basin, not because of its height, but because of the impressive flow of water. 
The Caura is a blackwater river, like the Caroní, the Ventuari River and the upper Orinoco.

Microclimate
Satellite images in the Intertropical Zone show an interesting lack of clouds above the biggest rivers, such as the Caura and Orinoco, and also in the Amazon river. We need to take into account two facts:

Satellite images, like aerial ones, are taken in the morning, when there are fewer clouds in the atmosphere.  
Sunshine heats up both water in rivers and land surface. However, water needs much more time to heating up than land does and atmosphere air is not heated by solar rays because it is diathermanous. It is heat coming up from soil and river waters, which in turn heat up the atmosphere. Therefore, difference of temperature between land and rivers is at its maximum at 10 a.m. (more or less). At that time, the land surface reflects heat to the atmosphere, making air ascend and condense, forming clouds, while water is still heating up and, thus, there is not outcoming heat to the atmosphere.

References

Williams, Llewelin. Exploraciones botánicas en la Guayana venezolana. El medio y bajo Caura. Caracas: Tipografía La Nación, 1942.
Chaffanjon, Jean. Voyage à travers les Llanos du Caura et aux Sources de l’Orénoque. Paris: 1885-87. 
Chaffanjon, Jean. L’Orénoque et le Caura. Relation de voyages exécutés en 1886 et 1887. Paris, Hachette et Cie., 1889. Edición en castellano: El Orinoco y el Caura. Caracas: Fondo Cultural Orinoco, Editorial Croquis S.R.L., 1986.

External links

Rivers of Venezuela
Orinoco basin